The 2000 season was the Arizona Cardinals' 81st season in the National Football League (NFL), their 102nd overall and their 13th in Arizona. The Cardinals ranked 24th in the NFL in total offense and 30th in total defense. The Cardinals ranked last in the NFC in Takeaways/Giveaways with a rating of −24.

The Cardinals surrendered 443 points in 2000, the second-worst in the NFL that season, and second-worst in franchise history. Arizona's minus-233 point differential is the worst in team history.

Two of the Cardinals' three victories came by one point each, and they were 0–8 on the road. Following the most lopsided of those eight road losses, 48–7 at Dallas in week eight, coach Vince Tobin was fired, ending his tenure in the desert after 4½ seasons with a 29–44 record. Defensive coordinator Dave McGinnis was named interim coach, and he held the job through the end of the 2003 season. The 3–13 mark would be matched in 2018.

The Cardinals suffered through their poorest season since the 1970 AFL–NFL merger, eclipsing the 4–12 marks of 1991, 1992, 1995 and 1997. The Cardinals also went 4–9–1 in 1971, 1972 and 1973, and 4–11–1 in 1986, and would suffer through another 4–12 campaign in 2003.

Offseason

Signings

Re-signings

Departures

NFL draft

Personnel

Staff

Roster

Regular season 
On December 18, Dave McGinnis was named as the 38th head coach in franchise history. He had been interim coach since October 23, when Vince Tobin was fired.

Schedule 

Note: Intra-division opponents are in bold text.

Standings

Best performances 
 David Boston, Week 1, 128 Receiving Yards vs. New York Giants
 David Boston, Week 2, 102 Receiving Yards vs. Dallas Cowboys
 David Boston, Week 7, 123 Receiving Yards vs. Philadelphia Eagles
 David Boston, Week 14, 184 Receiving Yards vs. Cincinnati Bengals
 Jake Plummer, Week 1, 318 Passing Yards vs. New York Giants
 Simeon Rice, Week 12, 3.0 Quarterback Sacks vs. Philadelphia Eagles

Records 
 Led NFL, kickoffs, 86
 Led NFL, kickoff yards returned, 2296
 Led NFL, average kickoff yards per return, 26.7
 Led NFL, kickoff returns for touchdowns, 3

References 

 Cardinals on Pro Football Reference
 Cardinals on jt-sw.com

Arizona
Arizona Cardinals seasons
Arizona